The Dance class of World War II were armed trawlers of the Royal Navy.

One Dance-class trawler (Sword Dance) was a war loss, and one (Saltarelo) was transferred to Portugal in 1945. Four were transferred to Italy in 1946: Gavotte, Hornpipe, Minuet and Two Step. None remained in service with the Royal Navy by the end of 1946.

Ships in class
Built by the Ardrossan Dockyard Company, Ardrossan, UK
 – Launched 1940, sold 1946
 – Launched 1940, sold 1946
Built by Cochrane & Sons, Ltd. Selby, UK
 – Launched 1940, sold 1946
 – Launched 1940, sold 1946
Built by Cook, Welton & Gemmell, Beverley, UK
 – Launched 1940, transferred to Italy 1946 as DR 312
 – Launched 1940, transferred to Italy 1946 as DR 316
Built by Ferguson Brothers (Port Glasgow) Ltd., Port Glasgow, UK
 – Launched 1940, sold 1946
 – Launched 1941, transferred to Italy 1946 as DR 307
Built by Goole Shipbuilding & Repair Company, Goole, UK
 – Launched 1940, sold 1946
 – Launched 1940, sold 1946
Built by Hall, Russell & Company, Ltd., Aberdeen, UK
 – Launched 1941, sold 1946
 – Launched 1941, sold 1946
Built by A. & J. Inglis, Ltd., Glasgow, UK (part of Harland and Wolff)
 – Launched 1940, sold 1946
 – Launched 1940, sold 1946
Built by Henry Robb, Ltd., Leith, UK
 – Launched 6 August 1940, transferred to Portugal 1945 as Salvador Correia 
 – Launched 1940, war loss 5 July 1942
Built by Smith's Dock Company, Ltd., South Bank-on-Tees, UK
 – Launched 1940, sold 1946
, ex-Tarantella – Launched 1941, transferred to Italy 1946 as DR 308
 – Launched 1941, sold 1946
 – Launched 1941, sold 1946

See also
 
 
 
 Trawlers of the Royal Navy

References
Robert Gardiner (ed. dir.), Conway's All the World's Fighting Ships 1922–1946, p. 66. London: Conway Maritime Press, 1980.
Francis E. McMurtrie and Raymond V.B. Blackman (eds.), Jane's Fighting Ships 1949–50, pp. 217, 258. New York: The McGraw-Hill Book Company, Inc., 1949

 
Mine warfare vessel classes
Minesweepers of the Italian Navy
Minesweepers of the Portuguese Navy
Patrol vessels of the Italian Navy
Patrol vessels of the Portuguese Navy
Ship classes of the Royal Navy